Chok River is a river in western India in Gujarat whose origin is Near Kalarvadh. Its basin has a maximum length of 20 km. The total catchment area of the basin is 63 km2.

References

Rivers of Gujarat
Rivers of India